Eddie Eyre (born Eddie Wilson on 24 July 1988) is a British actor who is known for his role in EastEnders as Josh Hemmings.

Education 
Eyre was educated at Abingdon School from 1999 to 2006. He was trained at the London Academy of Music and Dramatic Art.

Career 
Eyre's stage career began at The Old Vic, where he took part in the 24 Hour Plays, an event hosted by Kevin Spacey that has included actors such as Lily Cole, Catherine Tate, Douglas Booth and Kaya Scodelario. Eyre's other stage performances include Yakov in Headlong's production of The Seagull, Henry Crawford in the Mansfield Park stage adaptation by Tim Luscombe, produced by the Theatre Royal, Bury St Edmunds, and the lead role of Detective Sergeant Trotter in the West End production of the world's longest running play The Mousetrap.

Eyre played Gerold Hightower in the sixth season of the HBO series Game of Thrones. He joined the cast of BBC soap opera EastEnders as Josh Hemmings, a love interest for Lauren Branning (Jacqueline Jossa), in March 2017 and departed the following February. In May 2022, he appeared in an episode of the BBC soap opera Doctors as Steve Hedges.

Filmography

Film

Television

See also
 List of Old Abingdonians

References

External links

1988 births
Living people
Alumni of the London Academy of Music and Dramatic Art
British male stage actors
British male television actors
People educated at Abingdon School